Macey Estrella-Kadlec (née Evans; born March 24, 1990) is an American professional wrestler signed to WWE, where she performs on the SmackDown brand under the ring name Lacey Evans.

Originally introduced to wrestling while serving as a military police officer in the Marines, Evans trained and began her career on the independent circuit. She started working for WWE in their NXT developmental territory in 2016, and participated in their inaugural Mae Young Classic. After feuding with Kairi Sane in NXT, Evans debuted on Raw in January 2019, entering a feud with Becky Lynch that culminated in a mixed tag team match in the main event of Extreme Rules.

Early life 
Estrella-Kadlec was born Macey Evans in Georgia on March 24, 1990. According to ESPN, she was "raised in a home torn by depression, drug and alcohol abuse" and had to live in tents at times while growing up due to her parents' legal problems. Her father, who had entertained thoughts of becoming a wrestler but never acted on them, died of a drug overdose before she got her WWE tryout.

Military career 

Estrella-Kadlec is a veteran of the Marines, serving as a United States Marine Corps Military Police officer, including Special Reaction Team training. She enlisted at age 19 and served for five years, earning a bachelor's degree and starting a construction business while on active duty. She was introduced to professional wrestling while in the Marines through a Staff Sergeant who promoted independent shows on the side. On the second show of which she attended, the Staff Sergeant booked her to wrestle him.

Professional wrestling career

Independent circuit (2014–2015) 
Estrella-Kadlec trained under Tom Caiazzo at the American Premier Wrestling training facility in Statesboro, Georgia. She made her debut for the promotion in 2014, later winning the company's World Heavyweight Championship.

WWE

NXT (2016–2019) 

On April 12, 2016, Estrella-Kadlec signed a WWE contract. On October 20, at a house show, she made her wrestling debut as Macey Estrella, in a battle royal, which was ultimately won by Ember Moon. Three months later, in her first appearance on NXT, Evans teamed with Sarah Bridges in a tag team match which they lost to the team of Billie Kay and Peyton Royce. In 2017, Estrella was given the ring name Lacey Evans, which is coincidentally, her sister's maiden name. She was used mostly as a jobber to various competitors. In July, Evans participated in the inaugural Mae Young Classic, defeating Taynara Conti in the first round, but losing to Toni Storm in the second round.

On the January 17, 2018 episode of NXT, Evans established herself as a heel, as she complained to NXT general manager William Regal for allowing "the lowest forms of societal trash" like Nikki Cross, Ember Moon, and Kairi Sane to compete in the women's division. In April, Evans was placed in her first feud with Sane, as the two exchanged victories and attacked each other throughout the next few weeks. Eventually, Evans lost to Sane on the June 6 episode of NXT to end their feud. Throughout the rest of the year, Evans started a winning streak, defeating the likes of Dakota Kai and Candice LeRae. In December, she competed in a fatal four-way match to determine the number one contender for the NXT Women's Championship, however, the match was won by Bianca Belair.

Raw and SmackDown (2019–present) 
On the December 17, 2018 episode of Raw, Evans was advertised as one of six NXT wrestlers about to move to the main roster. She lost to Natalya in a dark match on the January 7, 2019 tapings of Main Event, and made her official main roster debut at the Royal Rumble on January 27. She entered the women's Royal Rumble match at number 1 and lasted over 29 minutes, eliminating The IIconics (Billie Kay and Peyton Royce), before she was eliminated by Charlotte Flair. After that, Evans repeatedly appeared on Raw, SmackDown, and pay-per-views to interrupt various segments and matches by walking out on stage, waving to the crowd, and leaving.

Shortly after WrestleMania 35, Evans was drafted to the Raw brand as part of the 2019 WWE Superstar Shake-up, and placed in her first feud on the main roster as she continuously attacked Raw and SmackDown Women's Champion Becky Lynch. This led to a title match between the two for the Raw Women's Championship on May 19, at Money in the Bank, where Evans lost to Lynch via submission. A few minutes later, Evans helped Flair win the SmackDown Women's Championship from Lynch as she hit her with her finisher, the Women's Right, and allowed her to take advantage of the attack. Throughout mid-2019, Evans continued to feud with Lynch and chase her for the Raw Women's Championship. On June 23, at Stomping Grounds, she lost again to Lynch, and in the main event, was Baron Corbin's choice for a special referee for the WWE Universal Championship match, due to Seth Rollins dating Lynch. On July 14, at Extreme Rules, Evans and Corbin challenged Lynch and Rollins for their respective titles in a Last Chance Extreme Rules match, where they failed to win the match after Rollins pinned Corbin, thus ending her feud with Lynch.

As part of the 2019 Draft in October, Evans was drafted to the SmackDown brand. On October 31, at Crown Jewel, Evans and Natalya became the first female wrestlers to wrestle in Saudi Arabia, where Evans lost. The two women embraced afterwards, breaking kayfabe to absorb their historical moment. On November 24, at Survivor Series, Evans then went on to compete in the first ever 15 woman elimination tag match representing Team SmackDown, where for the first time ever, the NXT women's locker room would also compete in the match. Evans was able to eliminate Charlotte Flair (Raw) by pin, after Asuka turned on her team and shot poison mist into Flair's eyes, allowing Evans to take advantage of the situation and hitting her with the Woman's Right. Shortly after, she was eliminated by Natalya (Raw) via roll up, however, Team NXT ultimately won the match when Rhea Ripley pinned Sasha Banks (SmackDown), making her the final woman standing. On the November 29 episode of SmackDown, Evans took exception to Banks and Bayley insulting the SmackDown roster, particularly the women, for losing to Team NXT at Survivor Series. After exchanging insults, Evans hit Banks with the Woman's Right and left the ring, thus turning face for the first time since early 2017. On January 27, 2020, at the Royal Rumble, Evans unsuccessfully challenged Bayley for the SmackDown Women's Title.

On April 5 (taped March 25/26), at WrestleMania 36, Evans was part of a five-way elimination match for the SmackDown Women's Champion. Evans lost the match after being pinned by Bayley after interference from Banks. On the April 24 episode of SmackDown, Evans competed against Banks in a qualifying match for the opportunity to be in the Women's Money in the Bank match. Evans won the match after hitting Banks with the Women's Right (while clutching a fan with a picture of her daughter on it in her hand) and pinning her. On May 10, at Money in the Bank, Evans was unsuccessful in the namesake match, as she was pulled down a ladder by Asuka, who went on to win. On the July 10 episode of SmackDown, Evans attacked Naomi, after she lost a karaoke contest to her, thus turning heel once again. As part of the 2020 Draft in October, Evans was drafted to the Raw brand.

On the January 4, 2021 episode of Raw, Evans started a storyline with Ric Flair when, during a match against Women's Tag Team Champions Charlotte Flair and Asuka, Evans flirted with Flair. During the following weeks, Flair managed Evans, usually distracting his daughter Charlotte, including a participation in the Women's Royal Rumble. On February 15, Evans' real-life pregnancy was announced and incorporated into a storyline on that night's episode of Raw, in which Flair is implied to be the father. Evans was scheduled to face Asuka for the Raw Women's Championship at Elimination Chamber but the match was cancelled due to her pregnancy; the storyline with Flair was cancelled as a result. She was reportedly planned to win the title at the event.

After over one year of inactivity due to her pregnancy, on the April 8, 2022 episode of SmackDown, Evans returned to the show as a face in a vignette talking about her life, but she was drafted to Raw as a heel character. Weeks later, she was moved to SmackDown again. On the June 10 episode of SmackDown, Evans made her in-ring return, turning again into a face character, defeating Xia Li to qualify for the Women's Money in the Bank ladder match. At the event, she was unsuccessful in winning the match. On the following episode of SmackDown, Evans turned heel when she berated the fans and attacked her tag team partner Aliyah.

Other media 
Estrella-Kadlec made her video game debut in the Rising Stars DLC for WWE 2K19, and as a regular playable character in WWE 2K20, WWE 2K22, and WWE 2K23.

Personal life 
Estrella-Kadlec has been married to her husband Alfonso, since January 13, 2010. The couple have two daughters and reside in Parris Island, South Carolina.

Controversy
On December 20, 2022; Estrella-Kadlec posted a video on her Instagram stories that claimed processed foods caused ADHD and Autism. Her story caused major backlash from both wrestling fans and her peers in the wrestling industry. All Elite Wrestling stars Nick Comoroto and Kip Sabian both revealed they have ADHD on Twitter as a response to Estrella-Kadlec with the latter harshly criticizing her.

Championships and accomplishments 
 American Premier Wrestling
 APW World Heavyweight Championship (1 time)
 Pro Wrestling Illustrated
 Ranked No. 23 of the top 100 female wrestlers in the PWI Women's 100 in 2019
 WWE
 Slammy Award (1 time)
 Trash Talker of the Year (2020)

References

External links 

 
 
 
 

1990 births
American female professional wrestlers
Living people
People from Parris Island, South Carolina
Professional wrestlers from South Carolina
United States Marines
21st-century American women
21st-century professional wrestlers